Sõnumileht was an Estonian tabloid newspaper between 1995 and 2000. The newspaper was published in the Estonian language, and was one of the country's most popular tabloid-style productions. It was first published in 1995. At first it was a quality newspaper. In 1998 after the Norwegian media group Schibsted bought a stake it moved to being a tabloid. In 1999, Sõnumileht had a daily circulation of around 30,000, making it Estonia's sixth largest circulation at the time.

Sõnumileht was maintaining serious press imago until 1998 while being run by editor-in-chief Mark Luik. Under the pressure of new owners it turned the course to yellow media in October 1998 with successful launch campaign. Around the same time Mart Luik resigned, new editor-in-chief was 25 years old sports journalist Urmo Soonvald.

It was in competition with Estonia's other tabloid newspaper Õhtuleht and this led in the summer of 1999 to a price war between the two newspapers. One result of this was that tabloid newspapers became very popular with Estonians and circulation of both newspapers increased.

On 3 July 2000, the two rival newspapers merged to form SL Õhtuleht.

External links
 Eesti Meedia (parent company website)

1995 establishments in Estonia
2000 disestablishments in Estonia
Defunct newspapers published in Estonia
Estonian-language newspapers
Mass media in Tallinn
Publications established in 1995
Publications disestablished in 2000